S1 also known as S1 Television is a 24-hour Hindi news channel launched in India by Mr. Vijay Dixit, CMD, Senior Media Group on 6 August 2005. It is an initiative of Senior Media Limited which also owns the fortnightly socio-political Hindi magazine 'Senior India'. The channel was launched in 2005. The channel is headquartered in Noida, Uttar Pradesh.

References
 http://www.contentsutra.com/entry/s1-news-channel-launch-this-month/
 http://www.lyngsat-address.com/ss/S1-TV.html

24-hour television news channels in India
Hindi-language television channels in India